"Touch Off" (stylized as "Touch off") is a single recorded by the Japanese rock band Uverworld, released through Gr8! Records on February 27, 2019. It reached 3rd place on Oricon chart, selling 33,340 copies in its first week. "Touch Off" was used as the season one opening theme for the 2019 anime The Promised Neverland.

Background
According to Takuya∞, "Touch Off" was the first song they made in 2018 before "Odd Future" and "Eden e". At first, they made its basic sounds more hip hop with acoustic guitar and drums but they had not yet created the lyrics. Later Takuya∞ made the lyrics based on the anime The Promised Neverland, telling to keep fighting spirits and to not give up for getting freedom.

Music video
The music video for "Touch Off" was directed by Masaki Okita, and features the band with hundreds of lighting and fire effects. Two versions of music videos were released by the band: the short version and the full version. Their official YouTube uploaded the short version on February 25, 2019, restricted to Japanese residents only. As of March 9, 2019, it has reached 542,094 views. The full version is available on the band's official website for a limited time.

Track listing

Personnel
Uverworld
 Takuya∞ – vocals, rap, programming, lyrics
 Katsuya – guitar
 Akira – guitar, programming
 Nobuto – bass guitar
 Shintarō – drums
 Seika – saxophone

Additional musician
 Satoru Hirade – arrangement

Charts

Sales

References

External links
 
 "Touch Off" music video at Uverworld official website (in Japanese)
 "Touch Off" at The Promised Neverland anime official website (in Japanese)

2019 songs
2019 singles
Anime songs
Electronic rock songs
Gr8! Records singles
Rap rock songs
Uverworld songs